Tinago National High School is a public national high school in Naga City, Bicol Region, Philippines. It is the seventh established public secondary high school in the Division of Naga City. It was founded in 2002, and its current principal is Ms. Sonia D. Teran, Ph.D.

History
Tinago National High Schools’ beginning is traced back on October 25, 2001 when Mayor Jesse M. Robredo instructed Mr. Pablo Marpuri and Mr. Pedro I. Pelonio Jr., the previous principals of Tinago Central School, and Mr. Herman E. Bobis, Education Supervisor I, to conduct a study on the possibility of opening a high school site in the area. The area was positively met by the then Schools Division Superintendent, Dr. Amy O. Oyardo, Tinago Barangay Council, and Tinago Central School PTA. After continuous, vigorous and rigorous follow-up, the dream came into fruition when Hon. Edilberto C. De Jesus, the then DepED Secretary approved the application for establishment on September 23, 2002. 

The city government of Naga supported the school with legislations ensuring that the institution push through with its educational mission. Enrolment for first year reached 129 on June 2002. The pioneering group was temporarily administered by Camarines Sur National High School. Teachers from the said school were deployed at Tinago National High School. By School Year 2003-2004, the school became independent and was headed by Mr. Sulpicio C. Alferez III. Mr. Hommer B. Celeste led the school in 2004 up to 2005, with Eleven (11) Teachers, one office staff and 420 students from first year to third year. In School Year 2007-2008, it has registered a total number of 742 students from first year to fourth year, with 25 teachers, one office staff, one security officer, and Teacher-in-Charge, Mr. Mariano B. De Guzman. At present, its enrolment totals to 611, with 24 Teachers (17 Regular Permanent, 7 Locally Funded), 4 Non-teaching Staff (1 Administrative Aide, 2 Security Guards, 1 Utility Worker) with Dr. Sonia D. Teran as the School Principal.

Personnel
The school is presently having seventeen (17) permanent teachers and six (6) locally funded teachers. Under the permanent positions, there were three teachers who are in the T-III position and the rest with a T-II or T-I position. Since year 2001, teachers were still continuing to upgrade their educational achievement. Most of them are continuing their post graduate study and one (1) of them is pursuing a law study. There were two (2) security guards in the school, one (1) is funded by the city government and the other is supported by the PTA. One (1) utility worker is assigned and one (1) staff who served as the office secretary.

External links 
 http://depednaga.com.ph/school_improvement_plan_sip.html

High schools in Camarines Sur
Educational institutions established in 2002
2002 establishments in the Philippines
Schools in Naga, Camarines Sur